Link-Belt or Link Belt may refer to:

 A linked-belt drive, a type of chain drive
 Link-Belt Cranes, a subsidiary of Sumitomo Construction Machinery Co.
 Link Belt station, a SEPTA railway station in Montgomeryville, Pennsylvania